Ismail Al Hammed (born 1 July 1988) is an Emirati footballer. He currently plays for Khor Fakkan and for United Arab Emirates national football team and represented them at the 2012 Summer Olympics.

International

International matches

International goals
Scores and results list the United Arab Emirates' goal tally first.

See also
 List of footballers with 100 or more caps

References

External links
 

1988 births
Living people
Emirati footballers
United Arab Emirates international footballers
Al Ahli Club (Dubai) players
Shabab Al-Ahli Club players
Khor Fakkan Sports Club players
2011 AFC Asian Cup players
2015 AFC Asian Cup players
2019 AFC Asian Cup players
Footballers at the 2012 Summer Olympics
Olympic footballers of the United Arab Emirates
UAE Pro League players
People from Abu Dhabi
Association football wingers
FIFA Century Club